William Bechtel (born 1951) is a professor of philosophy in the Department of Philosophy and the Science Studies Program at the University of California, San Diego.  He was a professor of philosophy at Washington University in St. Louis from 1994 until 2002 . Bechtel was also the chair of the Philosophy Department from 1999 until 2002 and was heavily involved with the Philosophy-Psychology-Neuroscience program, serving at different times as Assistant Director and Director. Before that, he was at Georgia State.  Bechtel earned his PhD from the University of Chicago and his BA from Kenyon College.

Bechtel's work in philosophy has focused on the philosophy of the life sciences. In particular, he has worked on cell biology, biochemistry, neuroscience, and cognitive science. Bechtel advocates a mechanistic approach to philosophy of science, taking the view that phenomena are often explained by specifying mechanisms. He argues that although this is more naturally in accordance with the actual methodology of life scientists, it contrasts with the traditional model of deduction from laws supported by mainstream philosophy of science.

Bechtel has also written about the nature of scientific discovery. He is the editor of the journal Philosophical Psychology.

Books
Mental Mechanisms: Philosophical Perspectives on Cognitive Neuroscience. London: Routledge
Discovering Cell Mechanisms. The Creation of Modern Cell Biology. Cambridge University Press. 2006.
Connectionism and the Mind: Parallel Processing, Dynamics, and Evolution in Networks. Basil Blackwell. 2002.
Discovering Complexity. Princeton University Press. 1993.

References

 William Bechtel at University of California, San Diego

21st-century American philosophers
Living people
Kenyon College alumni
University of Chicago alumni
Georgia State University faculty
Washington University in St. Louis faculty
University of California, San Diego faculty
1951 births
Fellows of the Cognitive Science Society